The 1971 Belgian Open Championships was a men's tennis tournament staged at the Leopold Club in Brussels, Belgium that was part of the Grand Prix circuit and categorized as a Group B event. The tournament was played on outdoor clay courts and was held from 17 May until 23 May 1971. It was the fifth edition of the tournament and Cliff Drysdale won the singles title.

Finals

Singles
 Cliff Drysdale defeated  Ilie Năstase 6–0, 6–1, 7–5
 It was Drysdale's 2nd singles title of the year and the 3rd of his career in the Open Era.

Doubles
 Marty Riessen /  Tom Okker and  Ilie Năstase /  Ion Țiriac divided

References

Belgian International Championships
Belgian International Championships
Belgian International Championships, 1971